Garden School is a coeducational independent school in East Elmhurst and Jackson Heights, Queens, New York City offering a nursery-grade 12 education.

History 

In 1923, a group of neighborhood parents banded together to organize the Garden Country Day School. The school took its name from the newly conceived garden apartment complexes built by Edward MacDougall, founder of the Queensboro Corporation, in the then-rural community of Jackson Heights.

The first classes, grades K–3, met in the Laburnum Court Apartments under the guidance of Dorothy Gleen, Charles Townshend, and Josephine Wech. Two years later, in 1925, grades 4–6 were added and John Bosworth Laing became the director. In 1927 Otis Flower assumed leadership as headmaster.

It was during the administration of Flower, and with the help of the Queensboro Corporation, that Garden Country Day School moved to its current location. Here Garden continued to grow, adding grades and then, in the spring of 1929, graduating its first high school class of three students. Within a few years Garden Country Day School became an independent school, with a board of trustees, under the New York State guidelines for not-for-profit schools.

Development plan 
Like many independent schools, Garden School's tuition does not cover the cost of educating the students. Annual capital campaigns and fundraising efforts play an important role in school culture and in providing added richness to the program.

The school also hosts a variety of annual events, such as a Walk-a-Thon and Gala each spring which have raised money for "smart boards" and other new technologies for the classrooms and improvement to the gym. 
Rory Staunton (1999-2012) was a student at the Garden School, known for his civic responsibility, inspiring leadership and kind heart. The Staunton family was one of the leading voices in support of the effort to turn the Garden School’s athletic field into public parkland, increasing the amount of recreational space in Jackson Heights by more than half an acre.

Associations
Garden School holds active memberships in professional associations including:

 Middle States Association of Schools and Colleges
 New York State Association of Independent Schools
 The Guild of Independent Schools
 The Parents League of New York
 National Association of Secondary School Principals
 National Association for College Admission Counseling
 New York State Association for College Admission Counseling
 The College Board
 Independent Schools Athletic League (New York)
 Girls' Independent Schools Athletic League

External links
Official website of the Garden School

Private high schools in Queens, New York
Private middle schools in Queens, New York
Private elementary schools in Queens, New York
Jackson Heights, Queens
1923 establishments in New York City
Educational institutions established in 1923